Blackhill railway station served the village of Blackhill, County Durham, England from 1867 to 1955 on the Derwent Valley Line.

History 
The station opened on 2 December 1867 by the North Eastern Railway. It was situated west of the end of St. Aldans Street. It opened as Benfieldside, then renamed Consett on 1 November 1882, renamed Consett & Blackhill on 1 May 1885 and finally renamed Blackhill on 1 May 1896.

The station was closed to passengers on 23 May 1955 with the end of services from Newcastle via .  Services from Durham via  had ceased back in 1939, whilst the Derwent Valley line from Scotswood followed suit in February 1954.

Goods traffic over the Derwent Valley line ended in November 1963 and the line through the station was abandoned; the track was lifted a year later. The former coal yard sidings immediately to the south though remained in use until 1984 by trains accessing the Consett Steel Works complex.

The station has been demolished and the trackbed is now a walking and cycle path.

References 

Disused railway stations in County Durham
Former North Eastern Railway (UK) stations
Railway stations in Great Britain opened in 1867
Railway stations in Great Britain closed in 1955
1867 establishments in England
1984 disestablishments in England
Consett